Nikola Mektić and Alexander Peya were the defending champions, but Peya could not participate due to injury. Mektić played alongside Franko Škugor but lost in the second round to Wesley Koolhof and Stefanos Tsitsipas.

Jean-Julien Rojer and Horia Tecău won the title after defeating Diego Schwartzman and Dominic Thiem in the final 6–2, 6–3.

Seeds

Draw

Finals

Top half

Bottom half

References

External links
 Main Draw

Men's Doubles